The Hong Kong Maritime Rescue Co-ordination Centre (HKMRCC) is responsible for coordinating air-sea rescue in Hong Kong and an extensive area of the South China Sea. Besides the territorial waters of Hong Kong, the area includes international waters lying to the north of latitude 10° north, to the west of longitude 120° east, and bounded by mainland China, Vietnam, the Philippines and Taiwan. The area covered is known as the Hong Kong Maritime Search and Rescue Region.

The MRCC is a co-ordination centre and neither possesses nor has direct command over search and rescue (SAR) resources. Its role is to co-ordinate all available SAR resources to perform a maritime search and rescue mission. In doing this it may call on the resources of:

 the Hong Kong Police Force Marine Region
 the Hong Kong Marine Department
 the Hong Kong Government Flying Service
 the Hong Kong Fire Services Department
 equivalent resources of other governments in the region
 naval forces in the region
 merchant shipping and fishing vessels in the vicinity of the incident

For administrative purposes, the MRCC forms part of the Hong Kong Marine Department.

References

External links
Hong Kong Maritime Rescue Co-ordination Centre website

Rescue coordination centres
Maritime Rescue Co-ordination Centre
Sea rescue organizations